Angola is a city in Pleasant Township, Steuben County, Indiana, United States. The population was 8,612 at the 2010 census. The city is the county seat of Steuben County. Angola was founded by Thomas Gale and Cornelius Gilmore on June 28, 1838, and is home to Trine University. The town is served by I-69 and the Indiana Toll Road (I-80 and I-90).

History
The Angola post office has been in operation since 1838.

Some of the first settlers came from Angola, New York, and they named their new home after their old one.

The Angola Commercial Historic District, Steuben County Courthouse, and Steuben County Jail are listed on the National Register of Historic Places.

Geography
The roads are known to the citizens of Angola as North and South Wayne street and West and East Maumee street.

Climate

There is an average of 119.4 days with measurable precipitation.

There are an average of 22.0 days with measurable snowfall.

Demographics

2010 census
As of the 2010 census, there were 8,612 people, 3,111 households, and 1,815 families living in the city. The racial makeup of the city was 93.6% White, 1.4% African American, 0.3% Native American, 0.8% Asian, 0.1% Pacific Islander, 2.1% from other races, and 1.7% from two or more races. Hispanic or Latino of any race were 6.3% of the population.

There were 3,111 households, of which 32.0% had children under the age of 18 living with them, 38.7% were married couples living together, 14.3% had a female householder with no husband present, 5.4% had a male householder with no wife present, and 41.7% were non-families. 33.1% of all households were made up of individuals, and 12.2% had someone living alone who was 65 years of age or older. The average household size was 2.35 and the average family size was 2.99.

The median age in the city was 30.3 years. 22.1% of residents were under the age of 18; 21.2% were between the ages of 18 and 24; 24% were from 25 to 44; 19.6% were from 45 to 64; and 13% were 65 years of age or older. The gender makeup of the city was 50.6% male and 49.4% female.

2000 census
As of the 2000 census, there were 7,344 people, 2,769 households, and 1,578 families living in the city. The racial makeup of the city was 94.00% White, 0.82% African American, 0.44% Native American, 1.23% Asian, 0.04% Pacific Islander, 1.92% from other races, and 1.57% from two or more races. Hispanic or Latino of any race were 3.89% of the population.

There were 2,769 households, out of which 30.4% had children under the age of 18 living with them, 41.0% were married couples living together, 11.8% had a female householder with no husband present, and 43.0% were non-families. 34.2% of all households were made up of individuals, and 13.5% had someone living alone who was 65 years of age or older. The average household size was 2.32 and the average family size was 2.99.

In the city, the population was spread out, with 22.7% under the age of 18, 20.7% from 18 to 24, 26.7% from 25 to 44, 17.0% from 45 to 64, and 12.9% who were 65 years of age or older. The median age was 29 years. For every 100 females, there were 105.8 males. For every 100 females age 18 and over, there were 107.3 males.

The median income for a household in the city was $34,925, and the median income for a family was $43,848. Males had a median income of $32,031 versus $23,258 for females. The per capita income for the city was $16,750. About 8.1% of families and 10.5% of the population were below the poverty line, including 6.5% of those under age 18 and 13.2% of those age 65 or over.

Media

Radio stations
100.3 WLKI-FM wlki
92.7 HOT FM 92.7
101.3 U-Rock

Television stations
63 WINM

WINM is a religious broadcaster and has slight viewership. Angola gets its main broadcast channels from Fort Wayne

Newspapers
The Herald Republican, the daily newspaper based in Angola and serving Steuben County, was formed through the merger of two longstanding weekly newspapers in Angola, the Steuben Republican (first published in May 1857) and The Angola Herald (January 1876). The newspapers consolidated their printing plants in 1925 and their ownership in the 1960s (in the Willis family), eventually merging into one publication in 1980. Two years later they were sold to Home News Enterprises, which expanded the paper to a twice-weekly format in 1989, and then in August 2001 to KPC Media Group of Kendallville, Indiana, which converted The Herald Republican to a daily in September 2001.

Social media 
Angola is home to TikTok superstar Andromeda Stetler, who has amassed over 37,000 followers at the time of writing with videos about their day-to-day life, as well as Rohan, their heavily-customized Jeep Wrangler. The videos often receive tens of thousands of views, and their Jeep is often spotted by Angolans, leading to Stetler's notability in the local community.

Transportation
Angola is served by Barons Bus Lines Schedule 0025: Cleveland, Ohio to Chicago, Illinois; and Schedule 0026: Chicago, Illinois to Cleveland, Ohio. Both routes feature local service via primarily US Route 20. These routes are an essential transportation service sharing similarities to that of the Essential Air Service, primarily funded by tax payers.

Education
The Metropolitan School District of Steuben County, which operates the following schools in Angola:
Carlin Park Elementary
Hendry Park Elementary
Ryan Park Elementary
Pleasant Lake Elementary
Angola Middle School
Angola High School
Educational Opportunity Center

Trine University

Angola has a lending library: the Carnegie Public Library of Steuben Co.

Notable people
 Lloy Ball, Olympic volleyball gold medalist
 John Barnes, science-fiction writer
 Brian Cardinal, NBA basketball player
 Hagood Hardy, 1937–1997, Canadian-American jazz musician and composer
 Lewis Blaine Hershey, 1893–1977, U.S. Army four-star general, second Director of the Selective Service
 Lois Irene Marshall, 1873–1958, wife of U.S. Vice President Thomas R. Marshall
 Edward Ralph May, 1819–1852, the only member of the Indiana Constitutional Convention of 1850 to vote for African American suffrage, practiced law in Angola from 1843 to 1852
 Wilbur Simpson, classical bassoonist
 Raymond E. Willis, U.S. Senator
 J. Walter Yeagley, former judge of the District of Columbia Court of Appeals

See also

 Fun Spot Park

References

External links

 Angola Chamber of Commerce

Cities in Indiana
Micropolitan areas of Indiana
Cities in Steuben County, Indiana
County seats in Indiana